USS Lumen AKA-30 was an  in service with the United States Navy from 1944 to 1946. She was scrapped in 1964.

History
Lumen (AKA–30) was named after the minor planet 141 Lumen, which in turn was named after an 1867 book by astronomer Camille Flammarion. She was laid down by Walsh-Kaiser Co., Inc. Providence, R.I., 19 July 1944 under a Maritime Commission contract; launched 20 November 1944; sponsored by Mrs. Alex Walker; and commissioned 29 December 1944.

After shakedown, Lumen departed Norfolk 29 January 1945, loaded troops and equipment at Pearl Harbor, then sailed for the Okinawa campaign, the largest amphibious operation of the Pacific War. Following brief stops in Eniwetok and Ulithi, the cargo ship arrived off Okinawa 17 April and under the threat of night air raids unloaded the men and cargo which were needed to secure this strategic base so close to Japan.

Departing Okinawa, Lumen arrived Saipan 27 April and for the rest of the war shuttled cargo among the islands in the South and central Pacific. She was at Pearl Harbor when news of Japan’s acceptance of the surrender terms was announced.

Although the major task of winning the war was successfully completed, another important mission lay ahead for the Navy. Returning to the western Pacific in mid-September, Lumen carried cargo in the Philippines and Japan to provide the occupation troops with reinforcements and supplies. Completing her duties in the Pacific, the cargo ship embarked veterans for return to the United States and steamed for the West Coast arriving early in 1946. Lumen’s short but useful career ended when she decommissioned at Charleston 23 March 1946.

She was turned over to the War Shipping Administration 5 November 1946, placed in the National Defense Reserve Fleet, and was berthed at Beaumont, Texas, until sold for scrap to Luria Bros. Co., Inc., 17 December 1964.

Awards
Lumen received one battle star for World War II service.

References

External links

NavSource.org: AKA-30 Lumen
51 Years of AKAs

 

Artemis-class attack cargo ships
World War II amphibious warfare vessels of the United States
Ships built in Providence, Rhode Island
1944 ships